Feliciano López and Fernando Verdasco were the defending champions, but did not participate this year.

Wayne Arthurs and Paul Hanley won the title, defeating Leander Paes and Nenad Zimonjić 5–3, 5–3 in the final.

Seeds

Draw

Draw

References
Draw

2005 Stockholm Open
2005 ATP Tour